Hurdle Mills is an unincorporated community in southern Person County and northern Orange County, North Carolina,  United States. It is located on North Carolina Highway 157, southwest of Roxboro, at an elevation of 614 feet (187 m).  The population was 3,770 at the 2010 census.

History
Hurdle Mills was originally known as Daniel's Mill, when the post office was established in 1846 with William Daniel as postmaster, and the original mill on the Flat River was built. In 1859, the name was changed to Hurdle's Mill, when the mill was purchased by the Hurdle family. In 1892 the township was renamed Hurdle Mills.

It is home to the Triangle Area Polo Club.

References

External links 
 

Unincorporated communities in Orange County, North Carolina
Unincorporated communities in Person County, North Carolina
Unincorporated communities in North Carolina
Populated places established in 1846
1846 establishments in North Carolina